CPR Bridge may refer to:
 CPR Bridge (Saskatoon), Saskatchewan
 Siska CPR Bridge, Siska, British Columbia
 Parry Sound CPR Trestle, Parry Sound, Ontario